Louis Hubert called Lucien Jusseaume (10 February 1861 – 8 July 1925) was a French decor painter.

Biography 
Born in the 19th arrondissement of Paris, Lucien Jusseaume was the son of Nicolas-Cyprien Jusseaume (b.1833), painter decorator, and Marguerite Pagand (b.1826). He married Berthe Lagoutte c. 1925.

He is considered one of the greatest theater designers, who always remained attached to the principle of realistic decor. He painted the scenery from the premiere at la Scala for Madame Butterfly in February 1904. He worked for the Théâtre Libre and also for the Comédie-Française before 1898, then almost exclusively for the Opera-Comique for a quarter of a century.

He was responsible for the mise en scène of Pelléas et Mélisande. Through traveling he was inspired by real scenery, like for Carmen, Le Juif polonais (in Alsace), and Mireille (in Provence). He is particularly remembered for the setting of the act "La Forêt" in Chantecler by Edmond Rostand.

Among his other works are King Lear (Théâtre Libre), Julius Caesar, Sapho, Ramuntcho, L'Honneur japonais (Théâtre de l'Odéon), Louise, Pénélope, Lorenzaccio, L'Enfant roi (Opéra-Comique).

He committed suicide in 1925 at his home 17  in the 10th arrondissement of Paris.

References

External links 
 Lucien JUSSEAUME on Artlyrique.fr
 Lucien Jusseaume, (French, 1861-1925) on Bidsquare
 Les décorateurs du cinéma muet en France on revue.org

20th-century French painters
20th-century French male artists
French production designers
1861 births
1925 suicides
Painters from Paris
Suicides in France
1925 deaths